The Farmer Boys were an American country music duo consisting of Bobby Adamson (born September 20, 1933) and Woodie Wayne Murray (September 29, 1933 – August 14, 2002).

Adamson and Murray were both natives of Arkansas who met in California when they sang a song together around a jukebox. In 1952 they started working together, singing at local dances with Adamson on lead vocals and Murray on harmony and guitar. Herb Henson gave them a spot on his television show, which broadcast out of Bakersfield, California on KERO. They eventually became nightly performers on the show, and Henson gave them the name The Farmer Boys, since they lived in Farmersville.

The Farmer Boys auditioned for MGM Records and were turned down, but Ken Nelson at Capitol Records liked them enough to sign them late in 1954, and they first recorded for Capitol on January 12, 1955. Their novelty songs became their most popular numbers, and their overall sound resembled that of Homer & Jethro. They appeared on the Grand Ole Opry and supported Webb Pierce, Hank Locklin, Carl Smith, and Elvis Presley on tour. They recorded a rockabilly single in 1956, "Cool Down Mame" b/w "My Baby Done Left Me", but soon returned to country. Roy Nichols, who played with Merle Haggard, played guitar on most of their records, and their 1957 sides featured The Desert Stars, who included Buck Owens among their members.

In 1957, their contract with Capitol expired, and they never issued another recording. They continued performing until 1964. In subsequent decades, their music has been the subject of interest by early rock and roll historians.

Discography

References

[ The Farmer Boys] at AllMusic

Country music groups from California
Capitol Records artists
Musical groups established in 1952
Musical groups disestablished in 1964
1952 establishments in California